Catalin Voss is a German inventor and entrepreneur.

He is the founder of startup company Sension and the Autism Glass Project at Stanford University.

Sension is a computer vision company that developed face tracking and expression recognition software used in education. It was acquired by GAIA Systems, a company owned by Toyota, in 2015. The Autism Glass Project is an application for use with the wearable technology product Google Glass that acts as a behavioral aid for children with autism. Voss invented Sension and the Autism Glass application while studying at Stanford University, in California, and ran his company from the Silicon Valley. Prior to coming to Stanford, Voss worked as a mobile engineer with Macintosh-designer Steve Capps at payments company PayNearMe while still a high school student at Leonardo da Vinci Gymnasium. Capps reportedly hired Voss, then 15 years old, after looking at several apps Voss had published on the App store and watching his podcast on iOS app development which Voss produced at age 14.

Voss's technology inventions have been seen as a potential tool for widening the bottleneck for autism treatment by helping those on the Autism Spectrum to better identify emotions. In 2015, Voss's research work has received grant support from Google and the Packard Foundation to evaluate whether this could be done in a 100-person clinical trial.

Voss was born in Heidelberg, Germany to a German father and Romanian mother.

Awards and accolades

Voss has received some recognition in the press and awards for his work. In 2013, the German magazine Der Spiegel published a 5-page profile on Voss at 18 years old. At age 19, Voss was named one of the 15 most impressive students at Stanford and listed as the youngest member of Business Insider's 40 Under 40: People To Watch In 2015.

In 2014, Voss' Autism Glass invention was featured in the novel Trueman Bradley - The Next Great Detective, which is the second installment of the Trueman Bradley series, by Alexei Maxim Russell. In the book, Trueman Bradley, an Autistic private detective, uses Voss' invention to "see" emotions and so improve his detective skills.

In 2016, Voss received the Lemelson-MIT Graduate Student prize.

References

Living people
21st-century German inventors
Businesspeople from Heidelberg
Stanford University alumni
German people of Romanian descent
1995 births